Madrasi chess is a chess variant invented in 1979 by Abdul Jabbar Karwatkar. The game uses the conventional rules of chess with the addition that when a piece is attacked by a piece of the same type but opposite colour (for example, a black queen attacking a white queen) it is paralysed and becomes unable to move, capture or give check.

Paralysis
Most of the time, two like pieces attack each other mutually, meaning they are both paralysed.  En passant pawn captures are an exception to this, since the attack is not mutual.  (The status of an en passant capture is open to debate, according to Pritchard.)

This paralysis rule is not usually extended to the kings, meaning that as in orthodox chess, the two kings cannot move to adjacent squares; when it is extended to kings, the variant is called Madrasi rex inclusive (sometimes shortened to Madrasi RI). Although it is possible to play complete games of both Madrasi chess and Madrasi RI, they have mainly been used as a condition in chess problems.

The diagram demonstrates some of the peculiarities of Madrasi. The black king is not in check from the rook on c5, because it (the rook) is attacked by the black rook on g5, meaning it is paralysed. In its turn, the c5 rook attacks the g5 rook, paralysing it. Likewise, the white rook on g2, also attacked by the g5 rook, is paralysed. The black rook on h4, however, is not paralysed, and is free to move. The knights on d8 and f7 also attack each other, as do the pawns on c2 and d3, so these pieces are also paralysed. Note that the bishop on d1 is not paralysed by knight on f2 attacking it – units have to be of a similar type (both knights, both bishops and so on) for paralysis to happen.

Releasing paralysis
There are two ways in which a paralysis may be released. The first is for a non-paralysed pieces to make a capture. In the example, White cannot play cxd3 because his pawn is paralysed, but he can play Nxd3, thus unparalysing his c2 pawn. The second way to unparalyse a piece is to cut off the line of attack from the paralysing unit by interposing a third piece. For example, 1.Be5 in the diagram cuts the line of attack from the g5 rook to the c5 rook and so unparalyses it. As a result, the white rook on c5 is now giving check. The only way for Black to escape the check in this instance is to re-paralyse the checking rook, which can be done by 1...Rc4. White then has the reply 2.bxc4 which is checkmate: Black has no safe squares for his king, he cannot capture the checking unit, he cannot interpose a piece between the checking unit and the king, and he cannot paralyse the checking unit (note that ...Rxe5 paralysing the c5 rook is not possible, because the g5 rook is paralysed by its counterpart on g2).

References

External links
Madrasi Problems

Chess variants
Fairy chess
1979 in chess
Board games introduced in 1979
Chess in India
Chennai
Madras Presidency